The demography of Alderney is analysed by the States of Alderney and produced in Census reports. A Census was lasted held in 2013 however more recently eCensus demographics are compiled annually using various Bailiwick of Guernsey databases.

Population 
As of 2017 the population of the island was estimated via the eCensus to be 1,985 with a seasonal population of over 3,000 during the summer because of tourism.

Gender 
Gender disparity on the island is calculated by the Social Security Department and published in the annual eCensus report. Since 2008 Alderney has had a majority female population which has fluctuated between  50.5% and 51.4%.

References 

Alderney